Clonlisk is a barony in County Offaly (formerly King's County), Republic of Ireland.

Etymology
Clonlisk derives its name from Clonlisk Castle (near Dunkerrin) and the townland of Clonlisk (Irish Cluain Leisc, "meadow of laziness").

Location

Clonlisk is located in southwest County Offaly.

History
Clonlisk was part of the territory of the Ó Cearbhaill (O'Carroll) of Éile (Ely).

List of settlements

Below is a list of settlements in Clonlisk:
Brosna
Moneygall
Shinrone

References

Baronies of County Offaly